Plantago maritima, the sea plantain, seaside plantain  or goose tongue, is a species of flowering plant in the plantain family Plantaginaceae. It has a subcosmopolitan distribution in temperate and Arctic regions, native to most of Europe, northwest Africa, northern and central Asia, northern North America, and southern South America.

Description
It is a herbaceous perennial plant with a dense rosette of leaves without petioles. Each leaf is linear, 2–22 cm long and under 1 cm broad, thick and fleshy-textured, with an acute apex and a smooth or distantly toothed margin; there are three to five veins. The flowers are small, greenish-brown with brown stamens, produced in a dense spike 0.5–10 cm long on top of a stem 3–20 cm tall.

Subspecies
There are four subspecies:
Plantago maritima subsp. maritima. Europe, Asia, northwest Africa.
Plantago maritima subsp. borealis (Lange) A. Blytt and O. Dahl. Arctic regions. All parts of the plant small, compared to temperate plants.
Plantago maritima subsp. juncoides (Lam.) Hultén. South America, North America (this name to North American plants has been questioned).
Plantago maritima subsp. serpentina (All.) Arcang. Central Europe, on serpentine soils in mountains.

Ecology and physiology
In much of the range it is strictly coastal, growing on sandy soils. In some areas, it also occurs in alpine habitats, along mountain streams. Some of the physiology and metabolism of this species has been described, of particular note is how the metabolism of this species is altered with elevated atmospheric carbon dioxide concentrations.

Uses 
Like samphires, the leaves of the plant are harvested to be eaten raw or cooked. The seeds are also eaten raw or cooked, and can be ground into flour.

References

External links

maritima
Edible plants
Flora of Asia
Flora of Europe
Flora of North America
Flora of South America
Halophytes
Plants described in 1753
Taxa named by Carl Linnaeus